Raveena Tandon (born 26 October 1972) is an Indian actress widely known for her variety of work in Hindi films. 
She is daughter of director Ravi Tandon. 
She is a receipient of several awards including a National Film Award and three Filmfare Awards. In 2023 she was awarded the Padma Shri, the fourth highest Indian civilian honour.

She made her acting debut in the 1991 action film Patthar Ke Phool, which won her the Filmfare Award for New Face of the Year. Tandon established herself by playing the leading lady in the commercially successful action dramas Dilwale (1994), Mohra (1994), Khiladiyon Ka Khiladi (1996), and Ziddi (1997).

She earned a nomination for the Filmfare Award for Best Supporting Actress for her role in the 1994 drama Laadla and in the late 1990s, she collaborated with Govinda in several successful comedies, including Bade Miyan Chote Miyan (1998), Dulhe Raja (1998) and Anari No.1 (1999). She also played against type in the crime dramas Ghulam-E-Mustafa (1997) and Shool (1999). 

In the 2000s, Tandon ventured into arthouse cinema with roles in the 2001 films Daman and Aks, both of which garnered her critical acclaim, winning the National Film Award for Best Actress for the former and the Filmfare Special Performance Award for the latter. Post her marriage with film distributor Anil Thadani, Tandon took a break from films. She intermittently appeared on television with shows like the Sahara One drama Sahib Biwi Gulam (2004), the dance reality show Chak De Bachche (2008) and talk shows Isi Ka Naam Zindagi (2012) and Simply Baatien With Raveena (2014). After several years of hiatus, Tandon starred in the thriller Maatr (2017) and appeared in a supporting role in K.G.F: Chapter 2 (2022). In 2021, she received praise for starring in the Netflix crime thriller web series Aranyak.

Tandon is also an environmentalist and has worked with PETA since 2002. Tandon has four children, two adopted and two with her husband.

Early life
Tandon was born in Bombay (present-day Mumbai) to Ravi Tandon and Veena Tandon. Tandon is a niece of character actor Mac Mohan and thus a cousin of Manjari Makijany, his daughter. She has a  brother Rajiv Tandon, who was married to actress Rakhi Tandon. She is also a cousin of actress Kiran Rathod. She started her career as a model.

She received her education at Jamnabai Narsee School in Juhu and attended Mithibai College in Mumbai. During her internship at Genesis PR, she got her first film offer. In an interview with Rediff Tandon stated, I never thought I would become an actress. I was an intern at Genesis PR, helping [ad-man] Prahlad Kakkar, when friends and people around me started complimenting my looks. But [photographer-director] Shantanu Sheorey gave me the first break. He called and said he wanted to shoot with me. That was the time when models were becoming actors. I refused film offers. Prahlad kept saying millions of people are waiting for this chance and you keep refusing it. So I thought there is nothing to lose. Then Patthar Ke Phool happened.

Acting career

1991—1994: Debut and breakthrough 
Tandon debuted with the film Patthar Ke Phool (1991) which was a hit; she received the Filmfare Award for Lux New Face of the Year for her performance. The film resulted in a breakthrough in her film career, and predominantly established her as an overnight star.

In 1992, she starred opposite Sanjay Dutt in Jeena Marna Tere Sang. The film was her only release of the year, and proved a moderate success. In 1993, Tandon had seven film releases. Dramas like Kshatriya and Divya Shakti were moderate successes. That year, she also starred in her Telugu cinema debut Bangaru Bullodu, which was recorded as a hit at the box office.

In 1994, Tandon established her status in the Bollywood film Industry as the leading lady of the cinema at the time, by appearing in ten features: out of which most of them were successful and four films were the amongst one of the highest grossing productions of the year and they were: Mohra, Dilwale, Aatish, and Laadla.  She was nicknamed "Mast Mast Girl" after her performance in song "Tu cheez badi hai mast mast "in film Mohra. Laadla also earned her a nomination for the Filmfare Award for Best Supporting Actress. Her other releases of that year included the thriller Imtihaan with Sunny Deol in lead and Saif Ali Khan and the cult comedy Andaz Apna Apna, the lattermost was a semi hit at the box office upon its release, and was not a major commercial success but has attained a cult status since years. Her Tamil debut Sadhu, was also a critical and commercial success. Her another release of the year: Zamane Se Kya Darna was profitable at the ticket window and emerged as a moderate success.

1994—1999: Rise to prominence and stardom 
In 1994, Tandon established her status in the Bollywood film Industry as the leading lady of the cinema at the time, by appearing in ten features: out of which most of them were successful and four films were the amongst one of the highest grossing productions of the year and they were: Mohra, Dilwale, Aatish, and Laadla.  She was nicknamed "Mast Mast Girl" after her performance in song "Tu cheez badi hai mast mast" in film Mohra. Laadla also earned her a nomination for the Filmfare Award for Best Supporting Actress. Her other releases of that year included the thriller Imtihaan with Sunny Deol in lead and Saif Ali Khan and the cult comedy Andaz Apna Apna, the lattermost was a semi hit at the box office upon its release, and was not a major commercial success but has attained a cult status since years. Her Tamil debut Sadhu, was also a critical and commercial success. Her another release of the year: Zamane Se Kya Darna was profitable at the ticket window and emerged as a moderate success. 

In 1995, she starred with Shah Rukh Khan for the first time in Zamaana Deewana; the film failed to do well. Her career was back on track with hit films such as Khiladiyon Ka Khiladi (1996) and Ziddi (1997) opposite  Sunny Deol, become the blockbuster hit of that year and Salaakhen (1998).
She also received praise for her performance in Ghulam-E-Mustafa, another hit of the year 1997.

In 1998, Tandon reinforced her status as a leading lady by appearing in two critically and commercially successful productions: Dulhe Raja and Bade Miyan Chote Miyan, and both of them proved to be one of the highest grossing films of the year. Her last release of that year, Bade Miyan Chote Miyan, co-starring Amitabh Bachchan and Govinda turned out to be the second biggest hit of the year. Tandon was offered the second lead in Kuch Kuch Hota Hai which went on to be the biggest hit of 1998, but she turned it down. Her other releases of that year were Gharwali Baharwali, Vinashak: The Destroyer, Pardesi Babu and Aunty No. 1, some of which were moderate critical and commercial successes.

In 1999, Tandon starred opposite Upendra in his self-titled Kannada psychological thriller film, Upendra, a box office success. She also starred in Anari No.1, which was a critical and commercial success.  She also received praise from critics for her performance in Shool.

2000—2006: Critical acclaim and further success 
In the 2000s, Tandon ventured into art house productions, to learn a realistic way of acting, and rejected several mainstream film offers. Tandon worked in films such as Bulandi (2000) and Aks (2001), which won her huge acclaim from the critics. She won many awards as well as the Filmfare Special Performance Award for her performance in Rakeysh Omprakash Mehra's Aks.

Her years in the industry paid off when she won the coveted National Film Award for Best Actress for her performance in Kalpana Lajmi's Daman: A Victim of Marital Violence (2001), where she played a battered wife to an abusive husband. She surprised critics and audiences with her performance in the film and received much appreciation for her work. Critic Taran Adarsh said: "Raveena Tandon lends credibility to the role of a battered wife and walks away with the honours. The pathos she conveys through her expressions makes you realise that she's a performer of substance".

Since then, she has starred in a number of critically acclaimed films, such as Satta (2003) and Dobara (2004), but has not had much box office success. Her role as a middle-class woman thrust into the world of politics in the former was praised. Critic Taran Adarsh wrote: "Raveena Tandon delivers a bravura performance. The actress takes giant strides as a performer, giving the right touches to her character. Here's a performance that's bound to be noticed". Her role as a schizophrenic in Dobara was also praised with one critic saying: "Raveena is in sync with her character, playing her part with elaan". Tandon also worked in the Sahara One television series Sahib Biwi Gulam, based on the 1953 Bengali novel Saheb Bibi Golam by Bimal Mitra.

Her only release in 2006 was Sandwich which opened to poor reviews and reception. After doing several films, she took a break from actively appearing in films.

2010s: Sporadic work in film and television 
In 2014, she judged season 1 of CEO's Got Talent on CNBC TV18 with Mahesh Bhatt and Raj Nayak. In 2015, she made a comeback to Bollywood in longtime friend Anurag Kashyap's magnum opus Bombay Velvet. Playing a sultry jazz singer, her brief performance was highly praised by critics. 

In 2017, she was seen in the thriller movie Maatr in which she plays a mother who seeks revenge for her daughter's rape. Her performance was lauded and she gained critical acclaim for her performance. Her next release of the year was Onir's Shab, where she plays a socialite.

2020s: OTT debut 
In 2021, Tandon made her OTT debut with the Netflix crime thriller web series Aranyak, and received positive reviews for her performance. In 2022, Tandon appeared in a pivotal role in K.G.F: Chapter 2 which became third highest-grossing Indian film of all time. Tandon will appear alongside Sanjay Dutt in the romantic comedy film Ghudchadi by Binoy Gandhi, slated for a late 2022 release.

Off-screen work

Tandon was chairperson of the Children's Film Society of India from 2003, but from 2004 the actress began to get complaints that she did not attend the organisation's meetings and that she was not involved with the activities set up by the society. In September 2005, Tandon resigned from her post citing personal reasons.

In November 2005, Tandon sued the websites, Shaadi.com and Shaaditimes.com, claiming that they were using unauthorised images of her to promote the site. She also sued the owner of Satyanet Solutions, as they claimed that Tandon and her husband had met through the website.

In November 2002, Tandon sang to support People for the Ethical Treatment of Animals. She has posed in many advertisement campaigns joining the likes of John Abraham, Shilpa Shetty and Amisha Patel. On the issue of cows being slaughtered for their skin, she said "Their abuse at the hands of corrupt skin and meat traders must be stopped".

Personal life
Tandon adopted two girls, Pooja and Chhaya, as a single mother in 1995 when they were 11 and 8-years-old, respectively. During late 90s she was dating Akshay Kumar, and  had announced him as her boyfriend.

She began dating film distributor Anil Thadani during the making of her film Stumped (2003). Their engagement was announced in November 2003 and she married Thadani on 22 February 2004, in Jag Mandir Palace in Udaipur, Rajasthan according to Punjabi traditions. In March 2005, Tandon gave birth to her daughter Rasha. In July 2008, she gave birth to her son Ranbirvardhan.

Awards and nominations

See also

List of Indian actresses

References

External links

 
 
 

1972 births
Living people
Actresses from Mumbai
Indian film actresses
Actresses in Hindi cinema
Actresses in Tamil cinema
Actresses in Kannada cinema
Actresses in Telugu cinema
Actresses in Bengali cinema
Indian television actresses
Indian web series actresses
Actresses in Hindi television
Female models from Mumbai
Film producers from Mumbai
Indian women film producers
Hindi film producers
Best Actress National Film Award winners
Filmfare Awards winners
Screen Awards winners
Bengal Film Journalists' Association Award winners
Mithibai College alumni
Businesswomen from Maharashtra
Indian LGBT rights activists
20th-century Indian actresses
21st-century Indian actresses
Recipients of the Padma Shri in arts